Teisseire may refer to:
Teisseire (company), a French manufacturer of flavored syrups founded by Mathieu Teisseire in 1720
People with the surname Tessiere
Aimé Teisseire (1914–2008), French military officer who fought with the Free French Forces in World War II
Camille Teisseire (1764–1842), French politician and businessman, grandson of Mathieu Teisseire
Jean-Pierre Teisseire (born 1940), French football player and former mayor of Cassis 
Lucien Teisseire, (1919–2007), French professional bicycle racer

See also
Teissier